Cool Springs Farm was a property in Franklin, Tennessee that was listed on the National Register of Historic Places in 1983 but was removed from the register in 1993.  The property was also known as Mallory Valley Farm.

History
An original log house on the property was built circa 1830 by Dr. James Carothers and was enlarged and remodelled circa 1856 by his son.

In 1993 the property was acquired by the City of Brentwood and the log house was dismantled and moved to Crockett Park, where it has been restored by volunteers.

References

Former National Register of Historic Places in Tennessee
Buildings and structures in Williamson County, Tennessee
Victorian architecture in Tennessee
Greek Revival houses in Tennessee
Houses completed in 1830
Farms in Tennessee
1830 establishments in Tennessee
National Register of Historic Places in Williamson County, Tennessee